Moulin Rouge is a 1952 British drama film, written and directed by John Huston, based on the 1950 novel by Pierre La Mure, and produced by John and James Woolf. The film follows artist Henri de Toulouse-Lautrec in 19th-century Paris's bohemian subculture in and around the Moulin Rouge, a burlesque palace. The film was screened at the 14th Venice International Film Festival, where it won the Silver Lion.

The film stars José Ferrer (Toulouse-Lautrec), Zsa Zsa Gabor (Jane Avril), Suzanne Flon, Eric Pohlmann, Colette Marchand, Christopher Lee, Peter Cushing, Katherine Kath, Theodore Bikel, and Muriel Smith.

Plot
In 1890 Paris crowds pour into the Moulin Rouge nightclub as artist Henri de Toulouse-Lautrec finishes a bottle of cognac while sketching the club's dancers. The club's regulars arrive: singer Jane Avril teases Henri charmingly, dancers La Goulue and Aicha fight, and owner Maurice Joyant offers Henri free drinks for a month in exchange for painting a promotional poster. At closing time, Henri waits for the crowds to disperse before standing to reveal his four-foot six-inch stature. A flashback reveals that, as a boy, Henri fell down a flight of stairs and injured his legs, which never healed properly due to a genetic disorder (his aristocrat parents were first cousins), leading him to devote himself to art. 

Walking home to his Montmartre apartment, he meets street walker Marie Charlet and helps her escape police apprehension. Henri is impressed that Marie remarks on his disability without judgment, and he lets her to stay with him. Gradually, he realizes poverty has made Marie cruel but has also rendered her free of society's hypocrisy. He dotes on her, but Marie takes advantage of him; one night, after staying out all evening, Henri waits for her return and angrily tells her to leave, and though they make up, Henri remains distrustful of Marie. When Marie insults the portrait Henri has made of her, he throws her out and then sinks into alcoholism so deeply that his landlady notifies his mother, who suggests he find Marie to dispel his depression. Henri finds Marie at a café, drunk and distraught. Marie reveals that she stayed with Henri merely to save money for her boyfriend, who has now left her. Henri returns to his apartment bent on suicide, turning on the gas. Waiting to asphyxiate, he is suddenly inspired to finish the Moulin Rouge poster for Maurice. Having survived his crisis, he secretly arranges to give Marie enough money for a new life.

The next day, Henri brings the poster to the dance hall and, though the style is unusual, Maurice accepts it. This leads to more and more success, but a racy portrait prompt Henri's father to denounce his work as "pornographic." Despite this, Henri keeps depicting Parisian nightlife, which earns him rivalries and fame but no genuine friends. One morning, he sees a young woman standing at the edge of Pont Alexandre III over the Seine River. Thinking she might be suicidal, he stops to talk to her. She tells him she isn't going to jump and throws a key into the water. Days later, Jane Avril goes shopping with Henri, where the young woman from the bridge is modeling gowns at a dress shop. She is Myriamme, Jane's friend who, unlike Jane, lives on her own earnings and not the patronage of rich lovers. Myriamme is a great admirer of Henri's paintings, and Henri is shocked to discover that she bought the portrait of Marie Charlet years before in a flea market. She reveals that the key she threw into the water belonged to a wealthy suitor, Marcel de la Voisier, who asked her to be his mistress but not his wife. While Henri continues to bitterly decry true love as an illusion, he falls in love with Myriamme. One night the two see dancer La Goulue on the street, washed-up, drunkenly insisting she was once a star, causing Henri to realize that the Moulin Rouge is now respectable and no longer caters to bohemians and misfits.

Myriamme informs Henri that Marcel has finally asked her to marry him. Henri, certain she loves the more handsome man, bitingly congratulates her for trapping Marcel. Myriamme asks Henri if he loves her, but, believing that she is only trying to spare his feelings, he lies and tells her he does not. The next day Henri receives a letter from Myriamme telling him that she loves him, not Marcel, but she believes Henri's bitterness over Marie has poisoned any chance for them to be happy together. He rushes to Myriamme's apartment, but she is already gone.

A year later, drunk in a dive bar, Henri still obsessively reads Myriamme's note. He is carried home, where delirium tremens make him hallucinate cockroaches, and in trying to drive them away, Henri falls down a flight of stairs. Henri is brought to his family's chateau but his condition worsens; on his deathbed, Henri's father reveals that Henri is to be the first living artist to be shown in the Louvre. Henri's father begs for forgiveness. In his last moments, Henri sees visions of figures from his Moulin Rouge paintings, including Jane Avril, who joyously dance around his bedroom.

Cast

Production
In the film, Ferrer plays both Henri and his father, the Comte Alphonse de Toulouse-Lautrec. To transform Ferrer into Henri required the use of platforms and concealed pits as well as special camera angles, makeup and costumes. Short body doubles were also used. In addition, Ferrer used a set of knee-pads of his own design allowing him to walk on his knees . He received high praise not only for his performance, but for his willingness to have his legs strapped in such a manner simply to play a role.

It was reported that John Huston asked cinematographer Oswald Morris to render the color scheme of the film to look "as if Toulouse-Lautrec had directed it". Moulin Rouge was shot in three-strip Technicolor. The Technicolor projection print is created by dye transfer from three primary-color gelatin matrices. This permits great flexibility in controlling the density, contrast, and saturation of the print. Huston asked Technicolor for a subdued palette, rather than the sometimes-gaudy colors "glorious Technicolor" was famous for. Technicolor was reportedly reluctant to do this.

The film was shot at Shepperton Studios, Shepperton, Surrey, England, and on location in London and Paris.

Reception
During its first year of release it earned £205,453 in UK cinemas and grossed $9 million at the North American box office.

According to the National Film Finance Corporation, the film made a comfortable profit.

Ferrer received 40 percent of the proceeds from the film as well as other rights. This remuneration gave rise to a prominent U.S. Second Circuit tax case, Commissioner v. Ferrer (1962), in which Ferrer argued that he was taxed too much.

Accolades

The film was not nominated for its color cinematography, which many critics found remarkable. Leonard Maltin, in his annual Movie and Video Guide declared: "If you can't catch this in color, skip it."

In an interview shortly after his successful film version of Cabaret opened, Bob Fosse acknowledged John Huston's filming of the can-can in Moulin Rouge as being very influential on his own film style.

The Moulin Rouge theme song became well known and made it onto the record industry charts.

The film was nominated for inclusion on the American Film Institute list of 100 Greatest Film Scores, but was not included on the final list.

Digital restoration 
The film was digitally restored by FotoKem for Blu-ray debut. Frame-by-frame digital restoration was done by Prasad Corporation removing dirt, tears, scratches and other defects. In April 2019, a restored version of the film from The Film Foundation, Park Circus, Romulus Films, and MGM was selected to be shown in the Cannes Classics section at the 2019 Cannes Film Festival.

See also
Moulin Rouge, 1928 film
Moulin Rouge, 1934 film
Moulin Rouge!, 2001 film

References

External links

1952 films
1952 romantic drama films
1950s historical romance films
Biographical films about painters
British historical romance films
British romantic drama films
Cultural depictions of Henri de Toulouse-Lautrec
1950s English-language films
Films based on French novels
Films directed by John Huston
Films scored by Georges Auric
Films shot at Shepperton Studios
Films set in the 1890s
Films set in the 1900s
Films set in the Moulin Rouge
Films shot in England
Films shot in London
Films shot in Paris
Films that won the Best Costume Design Academy Award
Films whose art director won the Best Art Direction Academy Award
Films with screenplays by John Huston
United Artists films
1950s British films